Daniel Wilson (2 July 1778 – 2 January 1858) was an English Bishop of Calcutta.

Life

Born in Spitalfields, London, Wilson was educated at St Edmund Hall, Oxford (BA, 1802; MA, 1804; DD, 1832); was ordained and became curate of Richard Cecil at, Chobham and Bisley in Surrey, where he developed into a strong Evangelical preacher; was tutor or vice-principal of St Edmund Hall, Oxford, and minister of Worton, Oxfordshire, 1807 to 1812; assistant curate at St John's Chapel, Bedford Row, Bloomsbury, 1808 to 1812 (where Richard Cecil had earlier been incumbent); sole minister there, 1812 to 1824; and vicar of St Mary's Church, Islington, 1824 to 1832, when he was consecrated Bishop of Calcutta and first Metropolitan of India and Ceylon. He founded an English church at Rangoon, Ceylon, in 1855 and St Paul's Cathedral, Calcutta (consecrated 1847). He was an indefatigable worker and as bishop was noted for fidelity and firmness. He also founded Dhaka College on 18 July 1841. It was completed in 1846 with the aid of the Bishop of Calcutta.

Wilson founded the Islington Clerical Conference in 1827 in his library.  In 1831, Wilson was one of the founders of the Lord's Day Observance Society.  He was associated with the Clapham Sect of evangelical Anglicans, the best known of whom is William Wilberforce.

In 1835, Wilson was noted for calling India's caste system "a cancer".

He died in Calcutta in 1858 and is buried in St. Paul's Cathedral, Kolkata.

Family

When Bishop Wilson left for India, his son Daniel Frederick Wilson, who was only twenty-seven at the time, took over as Vicar of Islington and served as such for over forty years. Another son became a missionary to indigenous Canadians in the Diocese of Algoma in the Ecclesiastical Province of Ontario. His daughter was fostered by Anne Woodrooffe.

Selected writings
 Numerous sermons published separately and in collections
 The Evidences of Christianity, . . . a Course of Lectures (2 vols., London, 1828–1830)
 Bishop Wilson's Journal Letters, addressed to his Family the first Nine Years of his Indian Episcopacy (1863; edited by his son Daniel Wilson, Vicar of Islington)
 The Divine Authority and Perpetual Obligation of the Lord's Day, asserted in seven sermons (London, 1831) (in print, from Day One)

Bibliography
 Journal Letters (see above)
 The Life of The Right Rev. Daniel Wilson, D.D., Late Lord Bishop of Calcutta and Metropolitan of India  by Josiah Bateman, 2 vols, London, 1860 volume 1 volume 2
 History of the Church Missionary Society by Eugene Stock, London, 1899.
 MacAulay, in Life and Letters of Lord Macaulay appears to suggest that there was a life written by Wilson's successor at Bedford Row, Baptist Wriothesley Noel (see  ), but this seems not to be listed at COPAC.
 Andrew Porter, ‘Wilson, Daniel (1778–1858)’, Oxford Dictionary of National Biography, Oxford University Press, 2004
 Robert Schueller, A History of Chobham, Phillimore -1989

External links
 Bishop Wilson and the Origins of Dalit Liberation
 St Paul's Cathedral, Calcutta
 Rev E F Wilson (grandson) family history page
 British History Online A History of the County of Middlesex: Volume 8: Islington and Stoke Newington parishes page on Churches
 St Mary's, Islington, official history page

References 

 Initial text of article from The New Schaff-Herzog Encyclopedia of Religious Knowledge, edited for style, and with additions 

Anglican bishops of Calcutta
1778 births
1858 deaths
English evangelicals
Evangelical Anglicans
Anglican bishops of West Malaysia